This is a demography of the population of Maldives, including population density, ethnicity, education level, health of the populace, economic status, religious affiliations and other aspects of the population.

Vital statistics

UN estimates

Registered births and deaths

Structure of the population

Fertility Rate (The Demographic Health Survey)
Fertility Rate (TFR) (Wanted Fertility Rate) and CBR (Crude Birth Rate):

Geographical differences 
The total fertility rate differs greatly from as low as 2.05 children per woman in Malé to a maximum of 3.88 children in Faafu.

Life expectancy at birth 

Source: UN World Population Prospects

Ethnic groups
The largest ethnic group is Dhivehin, native to the historic region of the Maldive Islands comprising today's Republic of Maldives and the island of Minicoy in Union territory of Lakshadweep, India. They share the same culture and speak the Dhivehi language. They are principally an Indo-Aryan people, closely related to the Sinhalese and having traces of Middle Eastern, South Asian, Austronesian and African genes in the population.

In the past there was also a small Tamil population known as the Giraavaru people. This group have now been almost completely absorbed into the larger Maldivian society but were once native to the island of Giraavaru (Kaafu Atoll). This island was evacuated in 1968 due to heavy erosion of the island.

Filipinos in the Maldives numbering 3,000 in 2018.

Languages

Dhivehi, an Indo-Aryan language closely related to the Sinhala language of Sri Lanka, and written in a specialized Arabic script (Thaana), is the official language and is spoken by virtually the whole population. English is also spoken as a second language by many.

Religion

Sunni Islam is the state religion. Historically, the Maldives were converted to Islam from Buddhism in the 12th century. 
Under the 2008 constitution Islam is the official religion of the entire population, as adherence to it is required for citizenship.

CIA World Factbook demographic statistics 
The following demographic statistics are from the CIA World Factbook, unless otherwise indicated.

Population
301,475 (July 2000 est.) - 369,031 (July 2007 est.)

Age structure
0–14 years: 22.3% (male 45,038/female 43,291)
15–64 years: 73.8% (male 180,874/female 171,703)
65 years and over: 3.9% (male 7,711/female 7,717) (2010 est.)

Sex ratio
 at birth: 1.05 male(s)/female
 under 15 years: 1.06 male(s)/female
 15-64 years: 1.04 male(s)/female
 65 years and over: 1.09 male(s)/female
 total population: 1.05 male(s)/female (2000 est.)

Nationality
 noun: Maldivian(s)
 adjective: Maldivian

Literacy
 definition: age 15 and over can read and write
 total population: 96.3%
 male: 96.2%
 female: 96.4% (2000 census)

Education
The average Maldivian citizen has 4.7 years of education

References

Further reading 
 H.C.P. Bell, The Maldive Islands, An account of the physical features, History, Inhabitants, Productions and Trade. Colombo 1883, 
 Xavier Romero-Frias, The Maldive Islanders, A Study of the Popular Culture of an Ancient Ocean Kingdom. Barcelona 1999,